María Sonia Laura González Martínez (born June 28, 1985), better known as Laura G, is a Mexican television presenter and journalist.

Biography
Laura G began her career at age 13, hosting a children's program called Entre Chavos on TV Azteca Monterrey. In Monterrey, she was also a host of the Multimedios shows TvTu and La Hora G. She earned a degree in Communication Sciences from the Monterrey Institute of Technology and Higher Education.

In 2008, she began working at Televisa as a reporter on the program Hoy. In 2009, she became known at the national level as host of the morning news show Primero Noticias and the nighttime show Sabadazo.

In December 2009, Alexis Núñez, producer of Los 10 Primeros, invited her to be part of this program together with the singer and comedian Omar Chaparro.

In 2011 she was involved in a scandal at Primero Noticias, directed by Carlos Loret de Mola, and eventually had to leave the show.

On the program Domingazo, during a 2011 tribute to Mario "Cantinflas" Moreno, she was attacked by a heifer. She initially feared for her physical safety but in the end had no major consequences.

In 2012, she premiered the program Ke Krees on the radio station KeBuena. In the same year she had a small part in chapter 3 of the third season of La familia P. Luche and dubbed the voice of Leilani on the Deutsche Welle series Beach Buggy Show.

In 2014 she also hosted the  program of Canal 5's PM Bar. The same year she appeared as a guest doing a sketch on the program .

In 2016 she led the Sunday program Me enseñas... ¡y ganamos! that aired at 10 am on 15 May on Las Estrellas, where three schools and special guests come on, as well as Don Apolinar, a puppet that assists in giving the right answers.

In 2018, Laura G confirmed that she would be working on the TV Azteca program entitled El club de Eva beginning on January 15.

References

External links
 
 

1985 births
Living people
Mexican radio presenters
Mexican television journalists
Mexican television presenters
Mexican women journalists
Monterrey Institute of Technology and Higher Education alumni
People from Nuevo León
Mexican women radio presenters
Mexican women television presenters
Women television journalists